Greenbrier County Courthouse is a historic courthouse building located at Lewisburg, Greenbrier County, West Virginia. In 1973 the courthouse and the adjacent spring house, the Lewis Spring, were listed on the National Register of Historic Places.

The courthouse was built in 1837, and is a two-three story, "T"-shaped brick building. The front facade features four large plastered brick columns.  Atop the building is a cupola belfry.  The Lewis Spring is enclosed in a small, well-preserved stone building. Adjacent is a high stone retaining wall constructed between 1785–1795.

The courthouse building was built from local brick by mason John W. Dunn (who was also an architect, but is not credited with the courthouse's design).

References

External links

Courthouses on the National Register of Historic Places in West Virginia
Government buildings completed in 1837
Buildings and structures in Greenbrier County, West Virginia
National Register of Historic Places in Greenbrier County, West Virginia
County courthouses in West Virginia
Historic American Buildings Survey in West Virginia
John W. Dunn buildings
Spring houses